Mangal Kalash is a Hindi-language 24/7 television channel, owned by Channel Divya Group. The channel is a free-to-air and available across all major cable (except InDigital in Mumbai) and DTH platforms as well as online.

References

Hindi-language television channels in India
Television channels and stations established in 2009
Hindi-language television stations
Television stations in Faizabad
Television stations in New Delhi